Jane Suuto (born 8 August 1978 in Mbale) is a Ugandan long-distance runner. She competed in the marathon at the 2012 Summer Olympics, placing 93rd with a time of 2:44:46.

References

1978 births
Living people
Ugandan female long-distance runners
Olympic athletes of Uganda
Athletes (track and field) at the 2012 Summer Olympics
People from Mbale District
Ugandan female marathon runners
20th-century Ugandan women
21st-century Ugandan women